Confession (lit. "Good Friends") is a 2014 South Korean neo-noir film starring Ji Sung, Ju Ji-hoon and Lee Kwang-soo.

Plot
Hyun-tae, In-chul and Min-soo have been best friends since childhood. Hyun-tae is a paramedic with a daughter in kindergarten, In-chul is a con man who works at an insurance company, and Min-soo is a small business owner. Hyun-tae's mother, who owns an illegal gambling arcade, asks In-chul to stage a robbery/arson of her arcade to get an insurance settlement. But when it results in her accidental death, the friends have a falling out and their relationships with each other are forever changed.

Cast
Ji Sung as Im Hyun-tae 
Baek Seung-hwan as young Im Hyun-tae
Ju Ji-hoon as Jung In-chul
Jeon Ji-hwan as young Jung In-chul
Lee Kwang-soo as Kim Min-soo 
Ham Sung-min as young Kim Min-soo
Lee Hwi-hyang as Hyun-tae's mother
Ki Gook-seo as Hyun-tae's father
Choi Jin-ho as Shin Yi Soo
Jung Ji-yoon as Mi-ran 
Jang Hee-jin as Ji-hyang 
Choi Byung-mo as Jae-gyu
Ri Min as Detective Choi 
Hwang Chae-won as Yoo-ri 
Yang Jae-young as Ho-sung 
Park Sang-hyeon as Department head Kim
Lee Young-soo as Detective Lee 
Ham Sung-min as Min-soo
Nam Moon-cheol as Chief of police 
Kwak Min-seok as Center head 
Jeon In-geol as Assassin

Awards and nominations

References

External links
 
 
 

2014 films
South Korean crime drama films
South Korean neo-noir films
2010s South Korean films